Baklanov (masculine) or Baklanova (feminine) is a Russian surname. Notable people with the surname include:

Georges Baklanoff (1881–1938), Russian operatic baritone
Gleb Baklanov (1910–1976), Soviet officer, Hero of the Soviet Union
Grigory Baklanov (1923–2009), Russian novelist
Oleg Baklanov (1932–2021), Soviet politician
Olga Baclanova (sometimes simply "Baclanova"; 1896–1974), Russian actress
Vera Baklanova (born 1947), Russian diver
 (1809–1873), Russian general, hero of the Caucasian War (see Monument to Yakov Baklanov)

Russian-language surnames